Grigg may refer to:

Surname:
Edward Grigg, 1st Baron Altrincham (1879–1955), British colonial administrator and politician
John Grigg, 2nd Baron Altrincham (1924–2001), British writer, historian and politician
Stevan Eldred-Grigg (born 1952), New Zealand author of novels, history books, essays and short stories
Albert Grigg (born 1873), Ontario merchant and political figure
Allan Grigg, also known as Kool Kojak, multi-platinum Brazilian-American songwriter, producer, film director and artist
Arthur Grigg (1896–1941), New Zealand politician of the National Party
Bob Grigg (1924–2002), British designer of the British Aerospace 146
Cecil Grigg (1891–1968), American football player
Charles Grigg, former comic artist for DC Thomson
Charles Leiper Grigg (1868–1948), the inventor of 7 Up in 1929
Chubby Grigg (1926–1983), American football tackle
Dick Grigg (1884–1972), Australian rules footballer
Eliza Grigg, New Zealand alpine ski racer
Etta Grigg (1880–1945), South Australian viola player
John Grigg (astronomer) (1838–1920), New Zealand astronomer
John Grigg (New Zealand politician) (1828–1901), 19th century Member of Parliament in Canterbury, New Zealand
Mary Grigg MBE (1897–1971), New Zealand politician of the National Party
May Grigg (1885–1969), South Australian portrait painter
Milton L. Grigg (1905–1982), Virginia architect known for restoration work at Colonial Williamsburg and Monticello
P. J. Grigg (1890–1964), British civil servant who became Secretary of State for War during WWII
Ron Grigg, British chemist, Professor of Organic Chemistry at the University of Leeds
Shaun Grigg (born 1988), Australian rules footballer
Simon Grigg (born 1955), New Zealand music businessman, writer, radio host, publisher, producer, DJ and archivist
Thomas Grigg (politician) (1889–1969), Australian politician
Thomas Grigg (musician) (1859–1944), South Australian violinist, teacher and conductor
Will Grigg (born 1991), footballer
William Norman Grigg (1963–2017), the author of several books from a Constitutionalist perspective

Geography/Astronomy:
Comet Grigg-Skjellerup, a periodic comet
Grigg (crater), lunar crater on the far side of the Moon
Grigg Peak, 2130 metres high, 13 km west of the Lyttelton Range in the Admiralty Mountains of Victoria Land, Antarctica

See also
Gigg (disambiguation)
Griggs (disambiguation)
Rigg (disambiguation)

nl:Grigg